An English muffin is a small, round and flat yeast-leavened (sometimes sourdough) bread which is commonly  round and  tall. It is generally sliced horizontally and served toasted. In North America, Australia and New Zealand, it is frequently eaten with sweet or savoury toppings such as butter, fruit jam, honey, eggs, sausage, bacon, or cheese. English muffins are an essential ingredient in Eggs Benedict and a variety of breakfast sandwiches derived from it, such as the McMuffin and can be used in place of other breads for French toast.

In various parts of the world, these products are commonly called English muffins to distinguish them from the sweeter cupcake-shaped products also known as muffins. English muffins are available in a wide range of varieties, including whole wheat, multigrain, cinnamon raisin, cranberry, and apple cinnamon.

Origin

The word muffin is thought to come from the Low German , meaning "little cakes". The Oxford English Dictionary also suggests a possible link to Old French , a type of bread. Originally it meant "any of various kinds of bread or cake".

The first recorded use of the word muffin was in 1703, and recipes for muffins appear in British cookbooks as early as 1747 in Hannah Glasse's The Art of Cookery. The muffins are described as being "like a Honey-comb" inside.

In the Oxford Companion to Food, Alan Davidson states that "[t]here has always been some confusion between muffins, crumpets, and pikelets, both in recipes and in name". The increasing popularity of flatbread muffins in the 19th century, is attested by the existence of muffin men, a type of hawker who would travel door to door selling English muffins as a snack bread before most homes had their own ovens.

Bell ringing

The bell-ringing of muffin men became so common that by 1839, the British Parliament passed a bill to prohibit bell ringing by muffin men, but it was not adhered to by sellers. In 1861, "goodsized" muffins from street-sellers were commonly sold for a halfpenny each; crumpets were about a penny.

In popular culture
The traditional English nursery rhyme "The Muffin Man", which dates from 1820 at the latest, traces to that custom.

A well-known reference to English muffins is in Oscar Wilde's 1895 play The Importance of Being Earnest.

By country

United Kingdom

English muffins are usually referred to simply as muffins in the UK; sweet American-style muffins are occasionally referred to as American muffins to differentiate. They are usually consumed with tea or coffee, and sometimes feature in afternoon tea served in UK hotels. They are also consumed for breakfast in the form of American-style breakfast sandwiches.

United States
"Mush muffins (called slipperdowns in New England) were a Colonial [American] muffin made with hominy on a hanging griddle." These and other types of flatbread muffins were known to American settlers, but they declined in popularity with the advent of the quickbread muffin.

References to English muffins appear in U.S. newspapers starting in 1859, and detailed descriptions of them and recipes were published as early as 1870.

A popular brand of English muffin in the U.S. is Thomas', which was founded by English immigrant Samuel Bath Thomas in 1880. Thomas opened a second bakery around the corner from the first at 337 West 20th Street in a building that remains known as "The Muffin House". Today the company is owned by Bimbo Bakeries USA, which also owns the Entenmann's, Boboli, Stroehmann, Oroweat, and Arnold brands.

Foster's sourdough English muffins were a popular brand of English muffin originally from San Francisco. They were a signature menu item at Foster's restaurants from the 1940s to the 1970s, and continued to be produced as a packaged brand until 2008.

Portugal
English muffins are very similar to the Portuguese .

Preparation of English muffins

See also

 Crumpet
Scone
Muffina sweet quickbread (in American English)
 List of breads
 List of British breads

References

British breads
British cuisine
American cuisine
Australian cuisine
Australian breads
New Zealand cuisine
New Zealand breads
Yeast breads
American breads
Breakfast